The Qualcomm Snapdragon modems are a series of 4G LTE, LTE Advanced, LTE Advanced Pro, and 5G NR modems found in many phones, tablets, laptops, watches and even cars.

Qualcomm Gobi 
The Qualcomm Gobi series was their modem branding before they switched to the X-series.

Qualcomm 4G X-series 
The Qualcomm Snapdragon X-series modems are the current line-up of 4G LTE modems.

Snapdragon X5 LTE Modem 

 LTE Technology: LTE FDD, Cellular Technology: WCDMA (3C-HSDPA, DC-HSUPA), WCDMA (DC-HSDPA, HSUPA), WCDMA (DC-HSDPA, DC-HSUPA), TD-SCDMA, CDMA 1x, EV-DO, GSM/EDGE
 Downlink LTE: LTE Category 4 (150 Mbit/s). 2x20 MHz carrier aggregation. Up to 64-QAM
 Uplink LTE: LTE Category 4 (50 Mbit/s). 1x20 MHz carrier aggregation. Up to 16-QAM
 Chipsets: Snapdragon X5 LTE Modem, Snapdragon 616 processor, Snapdragon 415 processor, Snapdragon 412 processor and Snapdragon 212 processor

Snapdragon X6 LTE Modem 

 LTE Technology: LTE FDD, LTE TDD, LTE Broadcast
Cellular Technology: WCDMA (DC-HSDPA, DC-HSUPA), TD-SCDMA, CDMA 1x, EV-DO, GSM/EDGE
 Downlink LTE: LTE Category 4 (150 Mbit/s). 2x20 MHz carrier aggregation. Up to 64-QAM
 Uplink LTE: LTE Category 5 (75 Mbit/s). 1x20 MHz carrier aggregation. Up to 64-QAM
 Chipsets: Snapdragon 430 processor, Snapdragon 429 Mobile Platform and Snapdragon 439 Mobile Platform

Snapdragon X7 LTE Modem 

 LTE Technology: LTE FDD, LTE TDD, LTE Broadcast
 Cellular Technology: WCDMA (3C-HSDPA, DC-HSUPA), WCDMA (DC-HSDPA, HSUPA), WCDMA (DC-HSDPA, DC-HSUPA), TD-SCDMA, CDMA 1x, EV-DO, GSM/EDGE
 Downlink LTE: LTE Category 6 (300 Mbit/s). 2x20 MHz carrier aggregation. Up to 64-QAM
 Uplink LTE: LTE Category 4 (50 Mbit/s). 1x20 MHz carrier aggregation. Up to 16-QAM
 Chipsets: Snapdragon X7 LTE Modem
The first Qualcomm modem with PCIe inter-chip link type.

Snapdragon X8 LTE Modem 

 LTE Technology: LTE FDD, LTE TDD, LTE Broadcast
Cellular Technology: WCDMA (DB-DC-HSDPA, DC-HSUPA), TD-SCDMA, CDMA 1x, EV-DO, GSM/EDGE
 Downlink LTE: LTE Category 6 (300 Mbit/s). 2x20 MHz carrier aggregation. Up to 64-QAM
 Uplink LTE: LTE Category 6 (100 Mbit/s). 2x20 MHz carrier aggregation. Up to 16-QAM
Chipsets: Snapdragon 617 processor, Snapdragon 650 processor and Snapdragon 652 processor

Snapdragon X9 LTE modem 

 LTE Technology: LTE FDD, LTE TDD, LTE Broadcast
 Cellular Technology: WCDMA (DB-DC-HSDPA, DC-HSUPA), TD-SCDMA, CDMA 1x, EV-DO, GSM/EDGE
 Downlink LTE: LTE Category 7 (300 Mbit/s). 2x20 MHz carrier aggregation. Up to 64-QAM
 Uplink LTE: LTE Category 13 (150 Mbit/s). 2x20 MHz carrier aggregation. Up to 64-QAM
 Chipsets: Snapdragon 625 processor, Snapdragon 626 processor, Snapdragon 435 processor, Snapdragon 427 processor, Snapdragon 450 Mobile Platform and Snapdragon 653 Mobile Platform

Snapdragon X10 LTE modem 

 LTE Technology: LTE FDD, LTE TDD, LTE Broadcast
 Cellular Technology: WCDMA (DB-DC-HSDPA, DC-HSUPA), TD-SCDMA, CDMA 1x, EV-DO, GSM/EDGE
 Downlink LTE: LTE Category 9 (450 Mbit/s). 3x20 MHz carrier aggregation. Up to 64-QAM
 Uplink LTE: LTE Category 4 (50 Mbit/s). 1x20 MHz carrier aggregation. Up to 16-QAM
 Chipsets:Snapdragon 810 processor and Snapdragon 808 processor

Snapdragon X12 LTE Modem 

 LTE Technology: LTE FDD, LTE TDD, LTE-U, LWA, LTE Broadcast
 Cellular Technology: WCDMA (DB-DC-HSDPA, DC-HSUPA), TD-SCDMA, CDMA 1x, EV-DO, GSM/EDGE
 Downlink LTE: LTE Category 12 (600 Mbit/s). 3x20 MHz carrier aggregation. Maximum 6 spatial streams. Up to 256-QAM. Up to 4x4 MIMO on one carrier
 Uplink LTE: LTE Category 13 (150 Mbit/s). 2x20 MHz carrier aggregation. Up to 64-QAM
 Samsung 14 nm LPP process
 Chipsets: Snapdragon X12 LTE Modem, Snapdragon 820/821 processor, Snapdragon 660 Mobile Platform, Snapdragon 630 Mobile Platform, Snapdragon 636 Mobile Platform, Snapdragon 670 Mobile Platform, Snapdragon 675 Mobile Platform, Snapdragon 665 Mobile Platform, Snapdragon 678 Mobile Platform

Snapdragon X15 LTE Modem 
 LTE Technology: LTE FDD, LTE TDD, LAA, LTE Broadcast
 Cellular Technology: WCDMA (DB-DC-HSDPA, DC-HSUPA), TD-SCDMA, CDMA 1x, EV-DO, GSM/EDGE
 Downlink LTE: LTE Category 15 (800 Mbit/s). 3x20 MHz carrier aggregation. Up to 256-QAM. Up to 4x4 MIMO on two carriers
 Uplink LTE: LTE Category 13 (150 Mbit/s). 2x20 MHz carrier aggregation. Up to 64-QAM
 Chipsets: Snapdragon X15 LTE Modem, Snapdragon 732G, Snapdragon 730(G), Snapdragon 720G, Snapdragon 712, Snapdragon 710

Snapdragon X16 LTE Modem 

 LTE Technology: LTE FDD, LTE TDD, LAA, LTE Broadcast
 Cellular Technology: WCDMA (DB-DC-HSDPA, DC-HSUPA), TD-SCDMA, CDMA 1x, EV-DO, GSM/EDGE
 Downlink LTE: LTE Category 16 (1000 Mbit/s). 4x20 MHz carrier aggregation. Maximum 10 spatial streams. Up to 256-QAM. Up to 4x4 MIMO on two carriers
 Uplink LTE: LTE Category 13 (150 Mbit/s). 2x20 MHz carrier aggregation. Up to 64-QAM
 Chipsets: Snapdragon X16 LTE Modem, Snapdragon 835 processor

Snapdragon X20 LTE Modem 

 LTE Technology: LTE FDD, LTE TDD including CBRS support, LAA, LTE Broadcast
 Cellular Technology: WCDMA (DB-DC-HSDPA, DC-HSUPA), TD-SCDMA, CDMA 1x, EV-DO, GSM/EDGE
 Downlink LTE: LTE Category 18 (1200 Mbit/s). 5x20 MHz carrier aggregation. Maximum 12 spatial streams. Up to 256-QAM. Up to 4x4 MIMO on three carriers
 Uplink LTE: LTE Category 13 (150 Mbit/s). 2x20 MHz carrier aggregation. Up to 64-QAM
 Samsung 10 nm LPE process
 Chipsets: Snapdragon X20 LTE Modem, Snapdragon 845 Mobile Platform

Snapdragon X24 LTE Modem 

 LTE Technology: LTE FDD, LTE TDD including CBRS support, LAA, LTE Broadcast
 Cellular Technology: WCDMA (DB-DC-HSDPA, DC-HSUPA), TD-SCDMA, CDMA 1x, EV-DO, GSM/EDGE
 Downlink LTE: LTE Category 20 (2000 Mbit/s). 7x20 MHz carrier aggregation. Maximum 20 spatial streams. Up to 256-QAM. Up to 4x4 MIMO on five carriers, Full-Dimension MIMO (FD-MIMO)
 Uplink LTE: LTE Category 13 (316 Mbit/s). 3x20 MHz carrier aggregation. Up to 256-QAM
 TSMC 7 nm FinFET process
 Chipsets: Snapdragon X24 LTE Modem, Snapdragon 855 Mobile Platform, Snapdragon 8cx

Table of Snapdragon 4G X-series modems

Qualcomm 5G X-series

Snapdragon X50 5G Modem 

 5G Technology: 5G NR NSA
 5G Spectrum: mmWave, sub-6 GHz
 5G Modes: TDD, NSA (non-standalone)
 5G mmWave specs: 800 MHz bandwidth, 8 carriers, 2x2 MIMO
 5G sub-6 GHz specs: 100 MHz bandwidth, 4x4 MIMO
 mmWave Features: Dual-layer polarization in downlink and uplink, Beam forming, Beam steering, Beam tracking
 5G Peak Download Speed: 5000 Mbit/s
 Samsung 10 nm FinFET process
 Chipsets: Snapdragon X50 5G Modem

Snapdragon X55 5G Modem 

 5G Technology: 5G NR FDD, 5G NR TDD, SA, NSA
 5G Spectrum: mmWave, sub-6 GHz, 5G/4G spectrum sharing
 5G Modes: FDD, TDD, SA (standalone), NSA (non-standalone)
 5G mmWave specs: 800 MHz bandwidth, 8 carriers, 2x2 MIMO
 5G sub-6 GHz specs: 200 MHz bandwidth, 4x4 MIMO
 5G Peak Download Speed: 7500 Mbit/s
 5G Peak Upload Speed: 3000 Mbit/s
 5G RF: 100 MHz envelope tracking, Adaptive antenna tuning
 Performance Enhancement Technologies: Qualcomm 5G PowerSave, Qualcomm Signal Boost, Qualcomm Smart Transmit technology, Qualcomm RF Gaming Mode Boost, Qualcomm Wideband Envelope Tracking
 LTE Technology: LTE FDD, LTE TDD including CBRS support, LAA, LTE Broadcast
 Cellular Technology: WCDMA (DB-DC-HSDPA, DC-HSUPA), TD-SCDMA, CDMA 1x, EV-DO, GSM/EDGE
 Downlink LTE: LTE Category 22 (2500 Mbit/s). 7x20 MHz carrier aggregation. Maximum 24 spatial streams. Up to 1024—QAM. Up to 4x4 MIMO on five carriers, Full-Dimension MIMO (FD-MIMO)
 Uplink LTE: LTE Category 13 (316 Mbit/s). 3x20 MHz carrier aggregation. Up to 256-QAM
 TSMC 7 nm FinFET process
 Chipsets: Snapdragon X55 5G Modem

Snapdragon X60 5G Modem 

 5G Technology: 5G NR TDD, FDD, SA, NSA
 5G Spectrum: mmWave-sub6 carrier aggregation, sub-6 carrier aggregation (FDD-TDD, FDD-FDD, TDD-TDD), Dynamic Spectrum Sharing (DSS), mmWave, sub-6 GHz
 5G Modes: FDD, TDD, SA (standalone), NSA (non-standalone)
 5G mmWave specs: 800 MHz bandwidth, 8 carriers, 2x2 MIMO
 5G sub-6 GHz specs: 200 MHz bandwidth, 4x4 MIMO
 5G Peak Download Speed: 7.5 Gbit/s
 Performance Enhancement Technologies: Qualcomm 5G PowerSave, Qualcomm Signal Boost, Qualcomm Smart Transmit technology, Qualcomm RF Gaming Mode Boost, Qualcomm Wideband Envelope Tracking
 5G Peak Upload Speed: 3 Gbit/s
 5G SIM: 5G Dual SIM support
 Cellular Technology: 5G NR, LTE, WCDMA (DB-DC-HSDPA, DC-HSUPA), TD-SCDMA, CDMA 1x, EV-DO, GSM/EDGE
 LTE Technology: LTE FDD, LTE TDD including CBRS support, LAA, LTE Broadcast
 Samsung 5 nm FinFET (5LPE) process

Table of Snapdragon 5G X-series modems

Other Qualcomm modems

9205 LTE Modem 

 CPU: ARM Cortex A7 Up to 0.8 GHz
 LTE Technology: Rel.14 LTE Cat-M1, Rel.14 LTE Cat-NB2
 Cellular Technology: Rel.12 EGPRS MSC12
 Downlink LTE: 0.588 Mbit/s (Rel.14 Cat-M1), 0.127 Mbit/s (Rel.14 Cat-NB2)
 Uplink LTE: 1.119 Mbit/s (Rel.14 Cat-M1), 0.1585 Mbit/s (Rel.14 Cat-NB2)

MDM9206 IoT Modem 

 CPU: ARM Cortex A7 Up to 1.3 GHz
 LTE Technology: LTE HD-FDD, LTE TDD (Rel.13 LTE Cat-M1, Rel.13 LTE Cat-NB1)
 Cellular Technology: E-GPRS
 Downlink LTE: 0.300 Mbit/s (Rel.13 Cat-M1), 0.020 Mbit/s (Rel.13 Cat-NB1)
 Uplink LTE: 0.375 Mbit/s (Rel.13 Cat-M1), 0.060 Mbit/s (Rel.13 Cat-NB1)

MDM9207-1 IoT Modem 

 CPU: ARM Cortex A7 Up to 1.3 GHz
 LTE Technology: LTE FDD, LTE TDD
 Cellular Technology: DC-HSPA, TD-SCDMA, GSM
 Downlink LTE: 10 Mbit/s
 Uplink LTE: 5 Mbit/s

FSM100xx 5G Modem 

 5G Technology: 5G NR
 5G Spectrum: mmWave, sub-6 GHz
 10 nm process

Related pages 

 List of Qualcomm Snapdragon processors
Qualcomm Adreno
 Qualcomm Hexagon
 Qualcomm Snapdragon

Similar platforms 

 Balong Modems by HiSilicon
 Exynos Modems by Samsung
 Helio M Modems by MediaTek
 XMM Modems by Intel
 Makalu/SC Modems by Unisoc (formerly Spreadtrum)

References

LTE (telecommunication)
Modems
Qualcomm IP cores